was the fourth shōgun of the Ashikaga shogunate who reigned from 1394 to 1423 during the Muromachi period of Japan. Yoshimochi was the son of the third shōgun Ashikaga Yoshimitsu.

Succession and rule
In 1394, Yoshimitsu gave up his title in favor of his young son, and Yoshimochi was formally confirmed in his office as Sei-i Taishōgun.  Despite any appearance of retirement, the old shōgun didn't abandon any of his powers, and Yoshimitsu continued to maintain authority over the shogunate until his death.  Yoshimochi exercised unfettered power as shōgun only after his father died in 1408.

In 1398, during the sixth year of the reign of King Taejo of Joseon, a diplomatic mission was sent to Japan.  Pak Tong-chi and his retinue arrived in Kyoto in 1398 (Ōei 5, 8th month).  Shogun Yoshimochi presented the envoy with a formal diplomatic letter; and presents were given for the envoy to convey to the Joseon court.

In 1408, Yoshimochi comes into his own as a shōgun. The next year Ashikaga Mochiuji becomes Kantō kubō. In 1411, Yoshimochi breaks off relations with China. Emperor Go-Komatsu abdicates in 1413, therefore Emperor Shōkō ascends the throne in repudiation of an agreement. This resulted in renewed hostility between the shogunate and supporters of Southern Court. Dissension erupts between Ashikaga Mochiuji, the Kantō Kubō in Kamakura, and Uesugi Zenshū (the Kantō Kanrei) in 1415, and the Uesugi rebels the following year, but it was quelled by Mochiuji by 1417.

A Korean attack on Tsushima (Ōei Invasion) happened in 1419, and serious famine with great loss of life occurred the next year. In 1422, there was a resurgence in supporters of the Southern Court. Yoshimochi cedes authority to his son in 1423, but he had to retake responsibilities of the office of shōgun when his son died in 1425. Yoshimochi followed his father's example by formally ceding his powers to a young son, fifth shōgun Ashikaga Yoshikazu, who was then 18.

Family 
 Father: Ashikaga Yoshimitsu
 Mother: Fujiwara no Yoshiko (1358–1399)
 Wife: Hino Eiko (1390–1431)
 Concubines:
 Tokudaiji Toshiko
 Kohyoe-dono
 Children:
 Ashikaga Yoshikazu

Era of Yoshimochi's bakufu
The years in which Yoshimochi was shōgun are more specifically identified by more than one era name or nengō.
 Ōei  (1394–1428)

Notes

References 
 Ackroyd, Joyce I. (1982) Lessons from History: the Tokushi Yoron. Brisbane: University of Queensland Press.  ;  OCLC 7574544
 Kang, Etsuko Hae-jin. (1997). Diplomacy and Ideology in Japanese–Korean Relations: from the Fifteenth to the Eighteenth Century. Basingstoke, Hampshire; Macmillan. ; 
 Sansom, George Bailey (1961).  A History of Japan: 1334–1615. Stanford: Stanford University Press. ; 
 Titsingh, Isaac. (1834). Nihon Ōdai Ichiran; ou,  Annales des empereurs du Japon.  Paris: Royal Asiatic Society, Oriental Translation Fund of Great Britain and Ireland. OCLC 585069

Ashikaga Yoshimochi
Ashikaga Yoshimochi
14th-century shōguns
15th-century shōguns
Yoshimochi
Yoshimochi